DietTribe is an American documentary-reality series on Lifetime. The series chronicles the weight loss efforts of groups of friends suffering from obesity, and debuted on January 5, 2009.

Overview
Each 60-minute episode follows the weight-loss efforts of a group of five friends, coached by personal trainer Jessie Pavelka and psychotherapist Stacy Kaiser. In each season the group is followed for 120 days, given specific diet and exercise guidelines and regular weigh-ins to monitor their progress.

Episodes

Season 1 (2009)

Season 2 (2009)

References

External links 
 DietTribe page at myLifetime site
 

2000s American reality television series
2009 American television series debuts
2009 American television series endings
2000s American documentary television series
English-language television shows
Lifetime (TV network) original programming